Sachiko Furuhata-Kersting (祥子・古畑=ケルスティング;  born August 12, 1965) is a Japanese concert pianist.

Biography 
Born in Yokohama in Japan, Furuhata-Kersting started piano lessons at the age of three. After winning the New Pianist competition in Japan, she relocated to Germany to study at the University of Music in Detmold and Robert Schumann Hochschule in Düsseldorf. Her instructors included Arnulf von Arnim, Roberto Szidon, Detlev Kraus, Naoyuki Taneda and Willem Brons. She has also completed master classes in Salzburg, Austria (with Prof. Liske), in Weimar, Germany (with Prof. Ringeissen) and in Sion, Switzerland (with Prof. Roberto Szidon). She regularly performs in Europe and Japan, and her CDs are produced by the classical label Oehms Classics.

Her recent CD release presents works of Beethoven and Schumann. That CD won the Music Arena Performance of the Year designation for 2014 in Japan. She has been regularly invited to perform across Europe, including in Italy, Spain, Germany, Switzerland, the Netherlands, as well as in Japan. Notable performances have included her 2011 debut in München, 2012 debut in Suntory Hall in Tokyo, 2013 debut in London, 2014 performance in Basel, 2015 concert in Luxembourg, 2017 debuts in Cardiff and Edinburgh, and a November 2017 debut at Carnegie Hall in New York. In addition to her solo recitals, Furuhata-Kersting has performed with several international orchestras including the Russian State Philharmonic, the German Radio Philharmonic Orchestra, and the Pfalztheater Orchestra, among others in Europe and Japan. She has also performed by invitation at numerous music festivals, including the EuroClassic and Kultursommer Rheinland-Pfalz Festival, playing several concerts.

In 2012, she was named a “Steinway Artist” by Steinway & Sons of New York and Hamburg.

Furuhata-Kersting's repertoire has included classical and romantic pieces from Mozart, Beethoven, Schumann, Brahms, Liszt, and Chopin.

Furuhata-Kersting's recent concerts have included performances in Tokyo, Basel and Düsseldorf (with Deutsche Radio Philharmonie at several venues,), a solo recital in Cardiff, Wales, a solo recital in Kaiserslautern, and a chamber concert in Dortmund, Germany. On July 29, 2017, Furuhata-Kersting debuted at Usher Hall in Edinburgh with a program featuring Beethoven, Schumann and Chopin.

References

Japanese women pianists
Women classical pianists
Living people
21st-century pianists
People from Yokohama
21st-century Japanese women musicians
1965 births
21st-century women pianists